Risk Strategies (officially incorporated as RSC Insurance Brokerage, Inc.) is a private insurance brokerage and risk management advisor. The firm was founded 1997 in Boston, Massachusetts, by its current chairman, Mike Christian, as a specialty risk management consultancy. In 2015, private equity insurance sector investor Kelso & Company acquired Kohlberg & Company's majority stake in Risk Strategies. In 2022 it was ranked the 25th fastest-growing private company in Massachusetts.

History
Risk Strategies was founded by Mike Christian in 1997 to provide risk management advice to upper middle market commercial clients, with a focus on private equity and healthcare. In 2000, it made its first acquisition of Andrew Anthony and Associates. By 2001, the company had 15 employees.

In 2002, Risk Strategies expanded as an insurance brokerage to provide clients with specialized coverages and alternative risk financing programs. By the end of 2006, Risk Strategies was licensed in 48 states.

A minority investment from WR Berkley enabled expansion into the Midwest and California markets as well as new practice areas and market categories.

In 2013, Kohlberg & Company, L.L.C, a private equity firm, acquired a majority interest in Risk Strategies. The new investment helped Risk Strategies expand into new markets and products. As of 2013, Risk Strategies had 10 offices, 120 employees, and $40 million in revenue.

With access to investment capital, Risk Strategies pursued acquisitions and hires across specialty industries. In 2014, Risk Strategies made its largest acquisition to date by acquiring, DeWitt Stern, a specialist in the Entertainment, Media, Private Client, and Fine Art insurance sectors. With this acquisition, Risk Strategies was considered a Top 35 broker nationally, with nearly $100 million in revenue and almost 400 employees nationwide.

In 2015, Kelso & Company acquired Kohlberg & Company's majority stake in Risk Strategies. In 2016, Risk Strategies entered Texas for the first time with the acquisition of A&E specialist Mclaughlin Brunson and Florida with Atlass Insurance Brokerage Group.

From 2014 to 2016 Risk Strategies made 22 acquisitions, and expanded into Louisiana, Maryland, Ohio, and Pennsylvania.

In 2019, then President John Mina was named chief executive officer Mina succeeded Michael Christian, Risk Strategies founder, and long-time CEO, who moved to the Executive chairman role.

As of July 2022, Risk Strategies has acquired 135 companies, and has an annual revenue of $958 million.

Management
As of August 2022, key people of the company are:
Mike Christian, founder and chairman
John Mina, chief executive officer (CEO)
Sharon Edwards, chief financial officer (CFO)
John Vaglica, chief mergers and acquisitions officer
Bob Dubraski, chief growth officer
Natalie Logan, chief legal officer
Amanda Mullan, chief human resources officer (CHRO)

Services
Services of Risk Strategies include:
Business Insurance
 Employee Benefits
Private Client Services
Risk Management Services

Acquisitions
Major acquisitions include:
Krauter & Company
Gowrie Group
DeWitt Stern
Dubraski & Associates
Academic Health Plans (AHP)

 UNIRISC
ProSafety
Brightstone
Gehring Group
Thomas McGee
Pawson Associates, Inc.

Awards
 Best Places to Work 2018, 2019, 2020, and 2021 by Business Insurance Magazine.
16th Largest Broker of US Business by Business Insurance Magazine
 9th Largest Privately Owned Broker by Business Insurance Magazine
 Ranked 2,374 on the Inc. 5000 list in 2021, 
Ranked 2,872 on the Inc. 5000 list in 2022.

Sponsorships
Sponsorships of the company include Ladies Professional Golf Association (LPGA) golfer Brittany Altomare.

Publications
Open access publications of Risk Strategies include:
2022 State of the Market

References

1997 establishments in Massachusetts
Risk management companies